The Weight Of History and Only Once Away My Son are songs made in collaboration by Brian Eno and Kevin Shields, released as a double A-side in April 2018 for Record Store Day.

History
"Only Once Away My Son" was originally released in October 2017 as part of Adult Swim's Singles Program. Both tracks were made available for streaming in October 2018.

Reception
In a positive review of "Only Once Away My Son" for Pitchfork, Marc Hogan wrote "[w]ith its decaying hums, low-end rumblings, and coruscating clatter, the instrumental track may not be groundbreaking for them, but it’s familiar in the best way. The biggest question: Is this good? Unequivocally, yes."

Track listing

References

Songs written by Kevin Shields
Songs written by Brian Eno
Record Store Day releases